Dakin Evans "Dusty" Miller (September 3, 1876 – April 19, 1950) was an American professional baseball player. He played 51 games in Major League Baseball for the Chicago Orphans in 1902, primarily as a left fielder.

External links

1876 births
1950 deaths
Major League Baseball left fielders
Chicago Orphans players
Kansas City Blues (baseball) players
Denver Grizzlies (baseball) players
Kansas City Blue Stockings players
Omaha Indians players
Des Moines Prohibitionists players
Omaha Rangers players
Seattle Siwashes players
Wichita Jobbers players
Little Rock Travelers players
Dubuque Dubs players
Baseball players from Iowa